Faralon Rock, mostly spelled Farallon Rock, is a small island in Trinidad and Tobago. It is located in the Gulf of Paria just off the coast of San Fernando.

References

Uninhabited islands of Trinidad and Tobago
Gulf of Paria